Community Consolidated School District 59 (CCSD59) is a school district based in Elk Grove Village, Illinois. The school district serves most of Elk Grove Village while serving parts of Arlington Heights, Mount Prospect, and Des Plaines. The district has 10 elementary schools, 3 junior high schools, and an early learning center. The junior highs schools send their students to Elk Grove High School, Rolling Meadows High School, Prospect High School or Maine West High School. District 59 covers an area of 24 square miles and 75,000 residents in the northwestern suburbs of Chicago.

References

School districts established in 1947
School districts in Cook County, Illinois
1947 establishments in Illinois
Arlington Heights, Illinois
Des Plaines, Illinois
Mount Prospect, Illinois